Mads Hansen (born 26 June 2000) is a Danish speedway rider.

Career
Hansen was the European Under-19 champion in 2018. After finishing fifth during the 2020 Individual Speedway Junior World Championship he won the first series race of the 2021 Individual Speedway Junior World Championship, which was held at Stralsund.

In 2022, he helped SES win the 2022 Danish Super League.

Major results

World individual Championship
2021 Speedway Grand Prix - 25th (0pts)
2022 Speedway Grand Prix - 20th (7pts)

References 

2000 births
Living people
Danish speedway riders